Dancing with the Stars is an Irish reality television series, airing on RTÉ One that started on 8 January 2017, hosted by Amanda Byram and Nicky Byrne. The show is based on the original UK version, and is part of the Dancing with the Stars franchise. The judging panel consists of Julian Benson, Loraine Barry and Brian Redmond.

Couples
In November 2016, it was reported that former Big Brother contestant, Hughie Maughan, would be participating in the competition. On 20 November 2016, it was reported that former RTÉ News reader, Teresa Mannion will be taking part in the series. Des Bishop was confirmed as the first celebrity on 9 December 2016, during an appearance on The Late Late Show; RTÉ later confirmed he would be taking part in the series on Twitter. On 11 December 2016, former Fair City actress Aoibhín Garrihy, Red Rock actress Denise McCormack and model Thalia Heffernan were confirmed to take part in the series. On 12 December 2016, RTÉ confirmed the remaining seven  contestants. Later that week, the professional dancing line-up was confirmed.

Scoring chart

Red numbers indicate the couples with the lowest score for each week.
Green numbers indicate the couples with the highest score for each week.
 the couple eliminated that week
 the returning couple that was called forward and eventually last to be called safe, but was not necessarily in the bottom
 the returning couple that finished in the bottom two and competed in the Dance-Off
 the winning couple
 the runner-up couple

Average chart
This table only counts for dances scored on a traditional 30-points scale. Extra points from the "Ballroom Blitz" are not included.

Highest and lowest scoring performances
The highest and lowest performances in each dance according to the judges' scale are as follows.

Couples' highest and lowest scoring dances

Weekly scores and songs
Unless indicated otherwise, individual judges scores in the charts below (given in parentheses) are listed in this order from left to right: Brian Redmond, Loraine Barry, Julian Benson.

Week 1
 Running order (Men)

Week 2
 Running order (Women)

Week 3
 Running order

Week 4: Movie Week
 Running order

Week 5Individual judges scores in the charts below (given in parentheses) are listed in this order from left to right: Brian Redmond, Loraine Barry, Darren Bennett.Due to an illness, dancer Darren Bennett filled in for Julian Benson for the night. 
 Running order

Week 6: Valentines WeekIndividual judges scores in the charts below (given in parentheses) are listed in this order from left to right: Brian Redmond, Loraine Barry, Darren Bennett.Darren Bennett once again filled in for Julian Benson this week.

 Running order

Week 7: Switch-Up WeekIndividual judges scores in the charts below (given in parentheses) are listed in this order from left to right: Brian Redmond, Loraine Barry, Darren Bennett.As with the previous two weeks, Darren Bennett once again filled in for Julian Benson.

Guest act: The cast of Sunny Afternoon, performing 'Lola' and 'You Really Got Me'.
 Running order

Week 8Individual judges scores in the charts below (given in parentheses) are listed in this order from left to right: Brian Redmond, Loraine Barry, Darren Bennett.Darren Bennett once again filled in for Julian Benson this week.

Guest act: Róisín O performing 'Give it Up'.
 Running order

Dance-Off

Judges' votes to save

Bennett: Denise & Ryan
Redmond: Denise & Ryan
Barry: Did not vote, but would have voted to save Denise & Ryan.Week 9: Icons Week

Julian Benson returned to the judges table after a four-week absence.

Guest act: The cast of Thriller - Live performing 'Man in the Mirror'.

 Running order

Dance-Off

Judges' votes to save

Benson: Dayl & Ksenia
Redmond: Dayl & Ksenia
Barry: Did not vote, but would have voted to save Dayl & Ksenia.Week 10
Guest act: Lyra performing 'Emerald'.

Running order

Dance-Off

Judges' votes to save

Benson: Aoibhín & Vitali
Redmond: Aoibhín & Vitali
Barry: Did not vote, but would have voted to save Aoibhín & Vitali.Week 11: Semifinal
Guest act: Riverdance
Running order

Dance-OffFor the Dance-Off, Dayl & Ksenia danced their Quickstep, while Denise & Ryan danced their Contemporary Ballroom.''

Judges' votes to save

Benson: Denise & Ryan 
Redmond: Dayl & Ksenia 
Barry: Denise & Ryan

Week 12: The Final
Guest act: The Vamps performing 'All Night'.
Running order

Dance chart
 Highest scoring dance
 Lowest scoring dance
 No dance performed

References

External links
 Official website

Season 01
2017 Irish television seasons